is the 31st single by Japanese singer Yōko Oginome. Written by Hinoky Team and Kayoko Ono, the single was released on December 1, 1993, by Victor Entertainment.

Background and release
"Mystery in Love" is a Japanese-language cover of the Eurobeat song "Heart on Fire/Juliet", which was released by the label A-Beat C. It was later covered by the original artist as "Mystery in Love/Virgin Elle".

The song was used as an image song for Phoenix Resorts' Seagaia Ocean Dome.

The B-side, "Born to Be Wild", is a Japanese-language cover of the Eurobeat song "Born to Be Wild/Edo", with lyrics written by Oginome.

Track listing
All music is composed by Hinoky Team; all music is arranged by Keiichi Takahashi.

References

External links

1993 singles
Yōko Oginome songs
Japanese-language songs
Victor Entertainment singles

ja:Mystery In Love